The 1946–47 FAW Welsh Cup is the 60th season of the annual knockout tournament for competitive football teams in Wales.

Key
League name pointed after clubs name.
FL D2 - Football League Second Division
FL D3N - Football League Third Division North
LC - Lancashire Combination
SFL - Southern Football League

Fifth round
Six winners from the Fourth round and six new clubs.

Sixth round
Six winners from the Fifth round plus two new clubs - winner and runner-up of the previous Welsh Cup.

Semifinal
Chester and Newport County played at Wrexham, Wrexham and Merthyr Tydfil played at Cardiff.

Final
Final were held at Cardiff, replay were held at Wrexham.

External links
The FAW Welsh Cup

1946-47
Wales
Cup